is a Japanese footballer who plays for Tokushima Vortis.

Club statistics
Updated to end of 2018 season.

References

External links
Profile at Tokushima Vortis

1988 births
Living people
People from Seto, Aichi
Association football people from Aichi Prefecture
Japanese footballers
J1 League players
J2 League players
Nagoya Grampus players
Tokushima Vortis players
Association football goalkeepers